Wintina Soo Wai Ting is a Hongkonger footballer who plays as a defender. She has been a member of the Hong Kong women's national team.

International career 
Soo capped for Hong Kong at senior level during the 2012 AFC Women's Olympic Qualifying Tournament.

See also 
 List of Hong Kong women's international footballers

References 

Living people
Hong Kong women's footballers
Women's association football defenders
Hong Kong women's international footballers
Year of birth missing (living people)